Jermaine Dupri Mauldin (born September 23, 1972) is an American rapper, songwriter, record producer, record executive, entrepreneur, and DJ.

Early life
Jermaine Dupri Mauldin was born on September 23, 1972, the son of Tina (Mosley) and Michael Mauldin, a Columbia Records executive. Dupri's artistic career began when he was 9 years old. His father, an Atlanta talent manager, had coordinated a Diana Ross show in 1982; to the delight of concert-goers, Dupri managed to get on-stage and dance along with Ross. Dupri got his start as a dancer for the hip hop group Whodini when he was twelve. He made an appearance in their music video for the song "Freaks Come Out at Night". He began performing around the country, appearing with Herbie Hancock and Cameo before he opened the New York Fresh Festival, with Run-D.M.C., Whodini, and Grandmaster Flash.

Career

1992–1996: Early career and breakthrough
In 1990, he produced his first act, the female hip hop trio Silk Tymes Leather. He later formed the teen duo Kris Kross (Chris Kelly and Chris Smith) after meeting the boys at a local mall in 1990. The group's first album, Totally Krossed Out, was released in 1992 and went multi-platinum due to the success of their singles "Jump" and "Warm It Up", both written and produced by Dupri. He established his own record label called So So Def in 1993. Shortly after, he discovered female R&B group Xscape at a festival in Atlanta and signed them to the label. Their debut album, produced entirely by Dupri, Hummin' Comin' at 'Cha, went platinum with the support of the singles "Understanding", "Love on My Mind", "Tonight" and "Just Kickin' It", with the later peaking at number 2 on the Billboard Hot 100. During the same year, on Yo! MTV Raps he met Da Brat through Kris Kross, signed her to his label So So Def Recordings, and released her debut Funkdafied (1994) which went platinum. So So Def Recordings entered into a distribution partnership with Columbia Records in 1993. In 1995, he collaborated with Mariah Carey for the first time on the number one hit single "Always Be My Baby." He contributed to Lil' Kim's 1996 album, Hard Core on the track "Not Tonight". He also produced and co-wrote singles for MC Lyte ("Keep On, Keepin' On"), The Braxtons ("So Many Ways"), and Whodini ("Keep Running Back"). In the same year, Dupri linked up with Kris Kross one last time for their third and final studio album. Producing the entire album, as well as its moderately successful singles ("Tonite's tha Night" and "Live and Die for Hip Hop").

1997–2003: Columbia, Arista Records
In 1997, Dupri co-wrote and produced several tracks on Usher's second album, My Way. The lead single, "You Make Me Wanna", reached number-one on the Rhythmic Top 40 and Hot R&B/Hip-Hop chart. The follow up single "Nice & Slow" went to number-one on the Billboard Hot 100 and Hot R&B/Hip-Hop chart, and the last single, "My Way" peaked at number-two on Billboard Hot 100. All three singles have been certified Platinum by Recording Industry Association of America (RIAA). A featured guest on the album, Monica, would also later become a protégé of Dupri, with her second album, The Boy Is Mine, dropping in July of that year. Dupri produced the single of the album "The First Night", which peaked atop the U.S. Billboard charts, with the album receiving triple platinum certification and universal acclaim from critics.

In 1998, Jermaine Dupri was involved in the release of Destiny's Child's eponymous debut album, producing and co-writing the track "With Me Part I". Dupri renewed the focus on his own music career, which proved successful with release of the singles "Sweetheart" featuring Mariah Carey (US#126), "The Party Continues" featuring Da Brat and Usher (U.S. #26), and "Money Ain't a Thang" featuring Jay-Z (U.S. #52), the three singles from his debut studio album Life in 1472. The album was certified platinum by the Recording Industry Association of America (RIAA) a month and half after release. Also that year he met soon-to-be frequent collaborator and production partner Bryan-Michael Cox, as well as 11-year-old rapper, known then as Lil' Bow Wow and signed him to So So Def Recordings. The two would later part ways after only 2 albums, but continued to frequently collaborate on later projects. The distribution deal with Columbia was terminated in 2002, with Dupri switching to Arista Records in 2003. Dupri worked on Tamar Braxton's debut album, Tamar on the track "Get None" as well as with Weezer and Lil Wayne on the song "Can't Stop Partying." He also collaborated with DJ Chuckie to make a vocal version of the song "Let The Bass Kick". He soon released his sophomore studio album Instructions in October 2001, featuring the single "Welcome to Atlanta", and containing a myriad of features (similar to his debut).

2004–2009: Confessions and The Emancipation of Mimi
In 2004, Dupri connected again with Usher contributing to Confessions co-writing and co-producing three consecutive singles Billboard Hot 100 number one songs "Burn", "Confessions Part II", and "My Boo". Confessions won Best Contemporary R&B Album and Best R&B Performance by a Duo or Group with Vocals. Confessions has been certified diamond by the Recording Industry Association of America (RIAA) and, as of 2012, has sold 10 million copies in the US and over 20 million copies worldwide.

In early 2005, Dupri reunited with Mariah Carey on her tenth studio album The Emancipation Of Mimi, which features the massive smash hit "We Belong Together". The album also featured the hit singles "It's Like That", "Shake It Off", and "Don't Forget About Us".  "We Belong Together" stayed at number one for fourteen non-consecutive weeks, becoming the second longest running number one song in US chart history, behind Carey's 1996 collaboration with Boyz II Men on "One Sweet Day". We Belong Together" won Grammy's for Best Female R&B Vocal Performance and Best R&B Song. The same year he worked on Wanted with Bow Wow, he co-produced and co-wrote the Hot 100 top 5 singles "Let Me Hold You" and "Like You". Later in December, Dupri produced and co-wrote Nelly's single "Grillz", which struck atop the Billboard charts yet again.

In early 2006, Dupri signed both Dem Franchize Boyz and Daz Dillinger to his label So So Def after transferring it from Arista Records to Virgin Records. The latter's album, So So Gangsta, was released in September of that year, while the former's label debut was released the following year with the album On Top of Our Game which topped the US Top Rap Albums with the hit songs "I Think They Like Me" and "Lean wit It, Rock wit It." The group also featured alongside Dupri on Monica's snap single, "Everytime tha Beat Drop" (U.S. #48) off her fifth album, The Makings of Me. In late 2006, Dupri executive produced the album 20 Y.O. by his then-partner, Janet Jackson, along with co-producing and co-writing half the tracklist and all of the singles. He returned for her ninth album, Discipline in 2008, producing the single "Rock With U".

In 2007, Dupri produced singles for Paul Wall ("I'm Throwed"), Donell Jones ("Better Start Talking"), Bone Thugs-n-Harmony ("Lil' L.O.V.E."), as well as multiple tracks for labelmate Jagged Edge. In October 2007, he published his memoir, "Young, Rich and Dangerous: The Making of a Music Mogul" (via Atria Books). In November 2007 co-produced and co-wrote with So So Def intern No I.D. this time on Jay-Z's tenth studio album American Gangster. The two contributed to the songs "Success" and "Fallin".

In 2008, Dupri reunited with Usher, Mariah Carey, and then-girlfriend Janet Jackson for their respective studio albums (Here I Stand, E=MC2, and Discipline respectively) producing multiple tracks on each. He also produced singles for Ashanti ("Good Good") and Nelly ("Stepped On My J'z").

In 2009, Dupri produced singles for Fabolous ("Money Goes, Honey Stay [When the Money Goes Remix]") and Bow Wow ("Roc The Mic").

2010–present: The Rap Game
On October 7, 2013, he replaced Randy Jackson as Carey's talent manager. He later parted ways with Carey in August 2014, though they still maintain a professional relationship, as he was a producer on nearly all of her albums since Daydream (1995).

In 2014, Dupri produced multiple tracks for Mariah Carey and Jagged Edge on their respective albums (Me. I Am Mariah... The Elusive Chanteuse and J.E. Heartbreak 2).

In 2015, Dupri and Queen Latifah created a reality television series, The Rap Game. The eight-episode series premiered on Lifetime on New Year's Day, 2016. It followed five emerging artists, ages 11–16, who were immersed in the Atlanta hip-hop scene in a quest to become a rap star. Dupri was joined by guests including Usher, Ludacris, Da Brat, T.I. and Silentó; they gave the competitors advice on what it takes to be in the industry.

In 2018, he was inducted into the Songwriters Hall of Fame. This made Dupri the second musician from the hip-hop genre to be inducted, with only Jay-Z being inducted prior.

Also in 2018, Jermaine Dupri and his "So So Def" brand celebrated an exhibit at the Grammy Museum in Los Angeles, California called, Jermaine Dupri & So So Def, 25 Years Of Elevating Culture.

In 2022, Dupri produced "If I Get Caught" with R&B duo Dvsn.

Personal life
He has a daughter, Shaniah Mauldin, with Pam Sweat, who appeared on reality TV show Growing Up Hip Hop: Atlanta.

From 2002 to 2009, Dupri was involved in a romantic relationship with singer Janet Jackson, which resulted in a brief musical connection.

Dupri is vegan and promoted the lifestyle through a PETA ad, encouraging fans to "Feel the beets. Lose the meats."

Discography

Awards and nominations
Grammy Awards

References

External links 

 
 
 
  SoulRnB.com group dedicated to Jermaine Dupri

1972 births
Living people
African-American businesspeople
African-American male rappers
African-American record producers
American hip hop dancers
American hip hop record producers
American Muay Thai practitioners
American music arrangers
American music industry executives
American music managers
American rhythm and blues musicians
Businesspeople from Georgia (U.S. state)
Businesspeople from North Carolina
Grammy Award winners
Musicians from Asheville, North Carolina
Rappers from North Carolina
Rappers from Atlanta
Rappers from Georgia (U.S. state)
Songwriters from Georgia (U.S. state)
Songwriters from North Carolina
So So Def Recordings artists
Southern hip hop musicians
Record producers from Georgia (U.S. state)
21st-century American rappers
21st-century American male musicians
African-American songwriters
21st-century African-American musicians
20th-century African-American people
American male songwriters